Troyes station (French: Gare de Troyes) is a railway station serving the town Troyes, Aube department, central France. It is situated on the Paris–Mulhouse railway. The station is served by regional trains towards Paris and Chaumont.

See also 

 List of SNCF stations in Grand Est

References

Railway stations in Grand Est
Buildings and structures in Troyes
Railway stations in France opened in 1848